= Miss Gay Memphis =

Drag pageantry event in Memphis, Tennessee, US

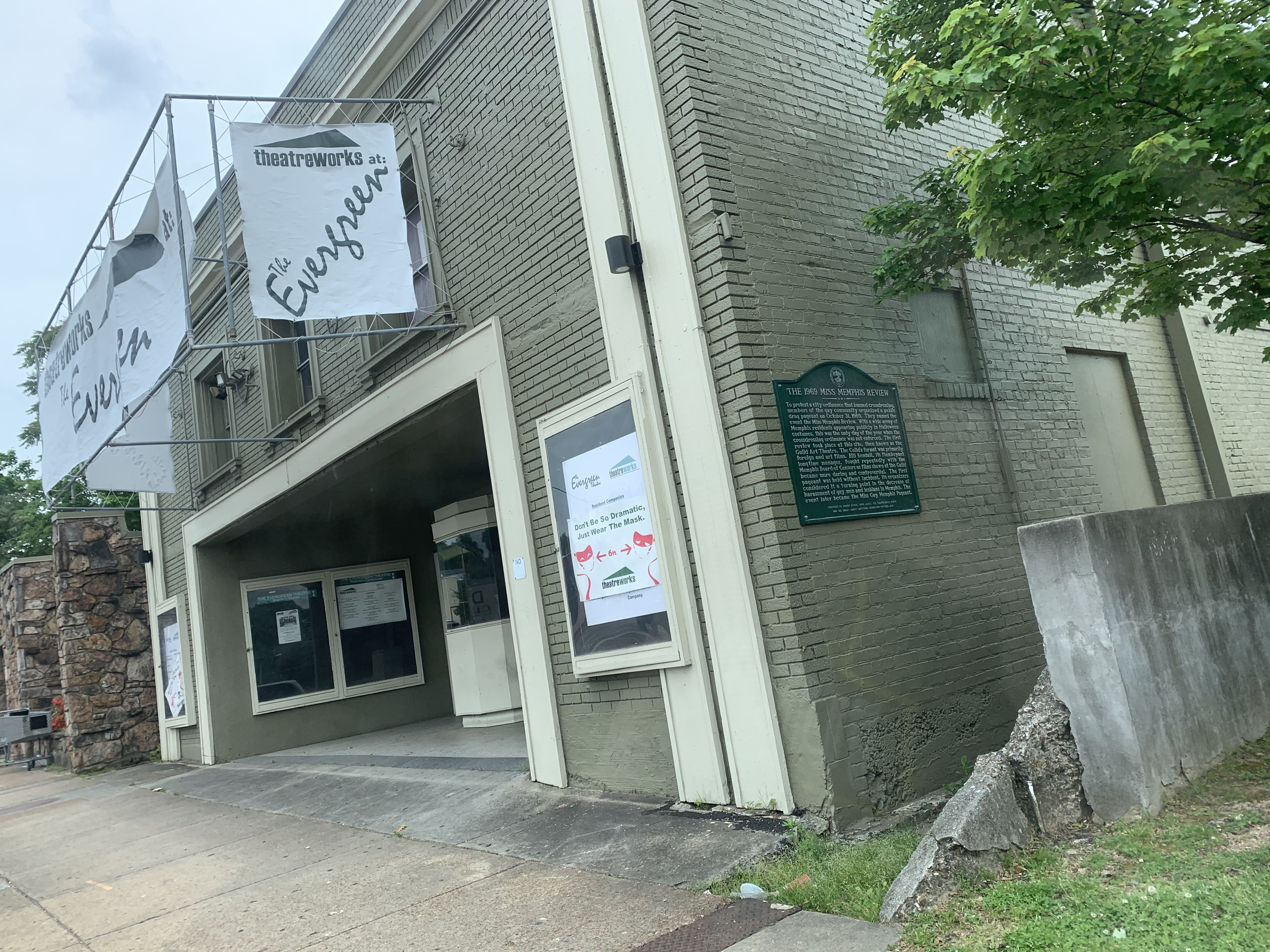
The Evergreen Theatre in Memphis, Tennessee where Miss Gay Memphis was held.

Miss Gay Memphis, which was originally called Miss Memphis Review, was the first drag or Female impersonation pageantry event in Memphis, Tennessee. The first Miss Gay Memphis event was held in the Guild Theatre, which is now called The Evergreen Theatre, on October 31, 1969, by the owner Bill Kendall.

== The Event ==
The Miss Gay Memphis Pageant is an event where men impersonate women and compete in several rounds with judges. At times cash and other various prizes were offered to the winner and runner ups that get selected by these judges.

== History ==
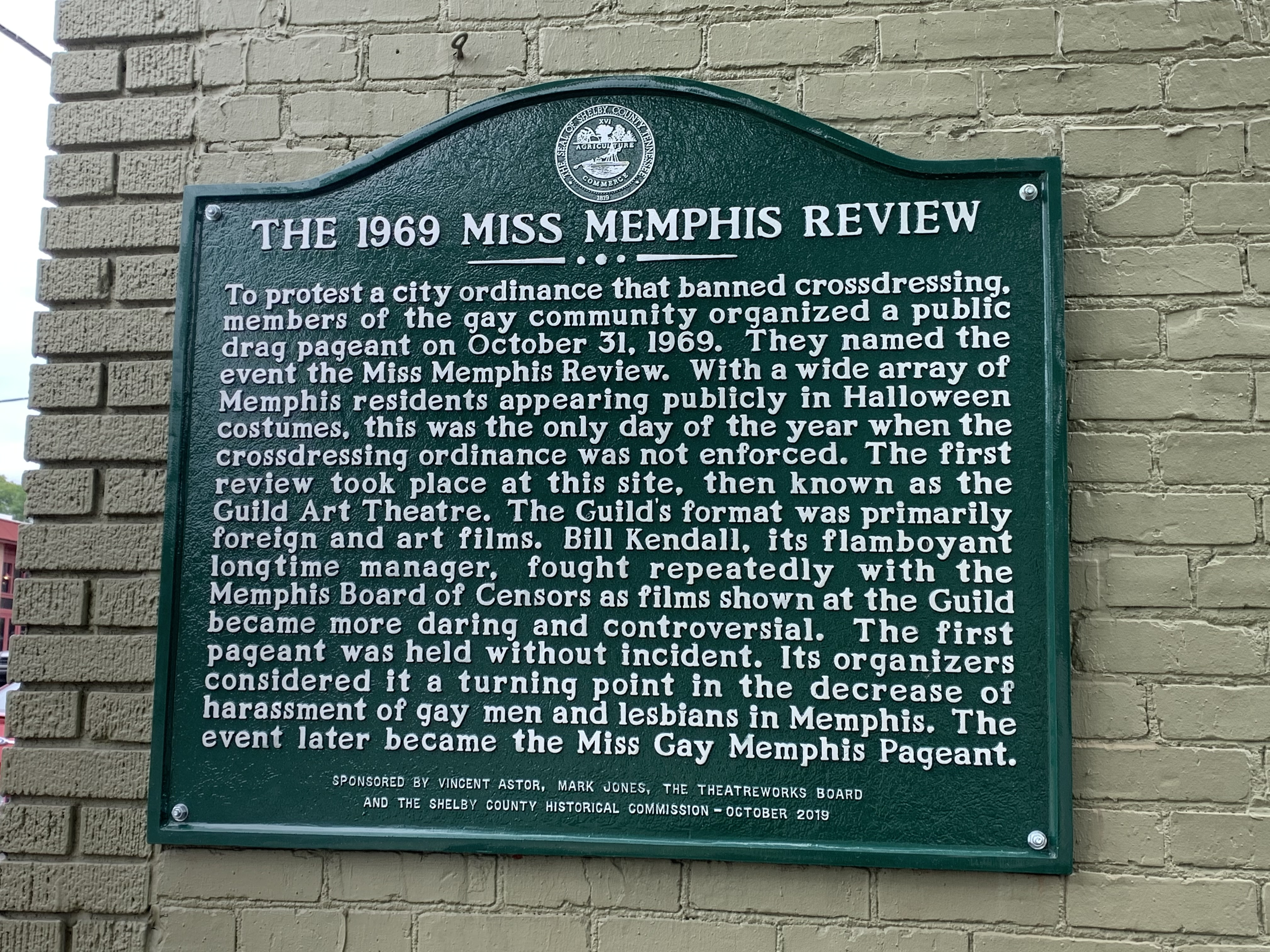
The Historical Plaque about the Miss Gay Memphis event, on the side of the Evergreen Theatre.

In Memphis during the 1950s and the 1960s, being a part of, or associating with, the LGBT community was considered taboo. People in the LGBT community were afraid that if they were caught doing events, like drag shows, they would be labeled as "degenerates, perverts, and deviants" or be arrested.

The first Miss Gay Memphis event was set during Halloween; cross-dressing at the time was illegal and could result in arrest, but on Halloween, it could be argued that crossdressing was only a costume. Bill Kendall, manager of the Guild Theatre, set up this event and brought gender-conforming women into the audience to deter possible police raids. Despite the worries of some attendees, no raids took place and the event went as planned.

On October 23, 2019, 50 years later, a historic marker was placed outside of the Evergreen to honor this event taking place.
